The Ponche et Primard Tubavion was a French experimental monoplane aircraft built in the early 1910s.

Specifications

References

Single-engined tractor aircraft
Aircraft first flown in 1912